McCoy Tyner Plays Ellington is the sixth album by jazz pianist McCoy Tyner. It was recorded in December 1964 and released on the Impulse! label in 1965. It features performances by Tyner with his John Coltrane bandmates: bassist Jimmy Garrison and drummer  Elvin Jones. Percussionists Willie Rodriguez and Johnny Pacheco appear on four of the tracks. It would be Tyner's last effort for the label, before signing with Blue Note.

Reception
The Allmusic review by Scott Yanow states that "This is an excellent outing that displays both Tyner's debt to the jazz tradition and his increasingly original style".

Track listing 
 "Duke's Place" (Ellington, Katz, Thiele) - 3:18
 "Caravan" (Ellington, Mills, Tizol) - 3:32
 "Solitude" (DeLange, Ellington, Mills) - 5:09
 "Searchin'" (Allen, Ellington) - 4:33
 "Mr. Gentle and Mr. Cool" (Baker, Ellington) - 6:28
 "Satin Doll" (Ellington, Mercer, Strayhorn) - 4:10
 "Gypsy Without a Song" (Ellington, Gordon, Lou Singer, Tizol) - 4:58

Bonus tracks on CD:
"It Don't Mean a Thing (If It Ain't Got That Swing)" (Ellington, Mills) - 4:02
 "I Got It Bad (and That Ain't Good)" (Ellington, Webster) - 5:57
 "Gypsy Without a Song" [Alternate Take] - 6:14

Recorded on December 2 (#8, 9), 7 (#3, 5, 7, 10) & 8 (#1, 2, 4, 6), 1964

Personnel 
 McCoy Tyner - piano
 Jimmy Garrison - bass
 Elvin Jones - drums
 Willie Rodriguez - congas & percussion (#1, 2, 4, 6)
 Johnny Pacheco - percussion (#1, 2, 4, 6)

References 

1965 albums
McCoy Tyner albums
Albums produced by Bob Thiele
Impulse! Records albums
Albums recorded at Van Gelder Studio
Duke Ellington tribute albums